The 2022–23 Niagara Purple Eagles men's basketball team represented Niagara University in the 2022–23 NCAA Division I men's basketball season. The Purple Eagles, led by fourth-year head coach Greg Paulus, played their home games at the Gallagher Center in Lewiston, New York as members of the Metro Atlantic Athletic Conference.

Previous season
The Purple Eagles finished the 2021–22 season 14–16, 9–11 in MAAC play to finish tied for fifth place. As the No. 5 seed, they were defeated by No. 4 seed Monmouth in the quarterfinals of the MAAC tournament.

Roster

Schedule and results

|-
!colspan=12 style=| Exhibition

|-
!colspan=12 style=| Regular season

|-
!colspan=12 style=| MAAC tournament

Sources

References

Niagara Purple Eagles men's basketball seasons
Niagara Purple Eagles
Niagara Purple Eagles men's basketball
Niagara Purple Eagles men's basketball